Henry Rawlins was an English priest in the  early  16th century.

Rawlins was educated at the University of Oxford. He became Canon of Sarum in 1512; Rector of Compton Bassett, Wiltshire, in 1521; and Archdeacon of Salisbury in 1524.

References

16th-century English people
Alumni of the University of Oxford
Archdeacons of Salisbury